Florești may refer to several places:

Moldova 
Florești, Moldova, a city in Moldova
Florești District, in Moldova
Florești, a village in Cobusca Veche Commune, Anenii Noi District
Florești, a village in Buciumeni Commune, Ungheni District

Romania 
Florești, Cluj, a commune in Cluj County
Florești, Mehedinți, a commune in Mehedinţi County
Florești, Prahova, a commune in Prahova County
Florești, a village in Bucium Commune, Alba County
Florești, a village in Câmpeni Town, Alba County
Florești, a village in Râmeț Commune, Alba County
Florești, a village in Scărișoara Commune, Alba County
Floreşti, a village in Căiuți Commune, Bacău County
Floreşti, a village in Huruiești Commune, Bacău County
Floreşti, a village in Scorțeni Commune, Bacău County
Floreşti, a village in Nimigea Commune, Bistrița-Năsăud County
Floreşti, a village in Beceni Commune, Buzău County
Floreşti, a village in Todireni Commune, Botoșani County
Floreşti, a village in Șimnicu de Sus Commune, Dolj County
Floreşti, a village in Florești-Stoenești Commune, Giurgiu County
Floreşti, a village in Țânțăreni Commune, Gorj County
Floreşti, a village in Laslea Commune, Sibiu County
Floreşti, a village in Horia Commune, Tulcea County
Floreşti, a village in Poienești Commune, Vaslui County

See also 
Florea (name)
Florescu (surname)